Christ Asleep during the Tempest is an oil on canvas painting by the French Romantic artist Eugène Delacroix, executed c. 1853. The painting is currently on display at the Metropolitan Museum of Art in New York City.

Delacroix painted at least six versions of the biblical story of Christ sleeping during a storm while on the Sea of Galilee. After seeing the painting in 1886, while it was on display in Paris, Vincent van Gogh wrote: "Christ’s boat—I’m talking about the blue and green sketch with touches of purple and red and a little lemon yellow for the halo, the aureole—speaks a symbolic language through color itself."

Gallery

References

1853 paintings
Paintings by Eugène Delacroix
Paintings in the collection of the Metropolitan Museum of Art
Paintings depicting Jesus
Paintings of apostles
Maritime paintings